Tainted Money is a 1924 American silent drama film directed by Henry MacRae and starring William Fairbanks, Eva Novak and Bruce Gordon.

Cast
 William Fairbanks as Chester Carlton
 Eva Novak as Adams' Daughter
 Bruce Gordon as Marston
 Edwards Davis as John Carlton
 Carl Stockdale 	
 Paul Weigel		
 Frank Clark

References

Bibliography
 Robert B. Connelly. The Silents: Silent Feature Films, 1910-36, Volume 40, Issue 2. December Press, 1998.

External links
 

1924 films
1924 drama films
1920s English-language films
American silent feature films
Silent American drama films
American black-and-white films
Columbia Pictures films
Films directed by Henry MacRae
1920s American films